Stencil refers to two typefaces released within months of each other in 1937.  The face created by 
R. Hunter Middleton for Ludlow was advertised in June, while Gerry Powell's version for American Type Founders appeared one month later.  Both fonts consist of only capital letters with rounded edges and thick main strokes, much like a Clarendon typeface, except with breaks in the face to give it the appearance of the  stenciled alphabets used on boxes and crates.  Powell's exploration of Stencil became very popular over time and is still used today.

Digital Copies 

Stencil has been copied by many digital producers, including Linotype GmbH, Adobe, URW++.  As the A.T.F. version is heavier, it is often called Stencil Bold when copied.

In 1997, Alexei Chekulaev made a Cyrillic version of Stencil Bold, called Stencil Cyrillic Regular.  

In Rookledge's Classic International Typefinder, the entry Stencil Bold shows the existence of a lowercase letters in the font that are unavailable from either actual type foundries or the producers of digital type.

Usage

Stencil is a common font for (typically american) army-themed displays, including The A-Team, Private Benjamin and M*A*S*H television series. It is also used with warehouse aesthetic.

It is also used for the credits on card labels on the crates of the Woodland Animations for the BBC Children's TV programme Bertha.
 
It is also used as the logotype for Disney's TV show, Recess.

The typeface was also used for Real Madrid shirt name and number font in the 2001 and 2002 seasons.

The typeface was used to render the names of the characters in the Incredible Crash Dummies action figure line.

Stencil is also used in the logo for The Home Depot and Réno-Dépôt.

It is also used in the logo for the talk show, Jerry Springer.

This typeface is also used in the logo for the reality television series Cops.

The Stencil typeface is also used for the English title screen and logo of the Japanese mecha OVA series from Gundam franchise, Mobile Suit Gundam 0080: War in the Pocket.

See also
Architype Albers
Display typeface
List of display typefaces
List of public signage typefaces

References

Display typefaces
Typefaces and fonts introduced in 1937
American Type Founders typefaces
Typefaces designed by R. Hunter Middleton
Letterpress typefaces
Military typefaces